Al Ahli Club Nabatieh is a football club based in Nabatieh, Lebanon.

See also 

 List of football clubs in Lebanon

References

1968 establishments in Lebanon
Football clubs in Lebanon